WPLN-FM (90.3 MHz), is a National Public Radio-affiliated station in Nashville, Tennessee. Since June 2011, the station has employed exclusively a news and talk format; until then, the station carried at least some classical music. The station maintains studios on Mainstream Drive north of downtown Nashville, studios that some consider among the finest radio production facilities in the U.S.

Overview
Nashville Public Radio offers five program streams: WPLN (AM); WPLN-FM; HD-2 and HD-3, which are multicasts from the main FM channel; and WNXP (see below). All five are also streamed on the radio station's website.

WPLN-FM's signal, which is transmitted from a tower on Johnson Chapel Road in Williamson County (just outside Brentwood), travels in about a 65-mile radius, reaching most of Middle Tennessee and some counties in southern Kentucky. WPLN-FM shares the tower with three other Nashville FM stations: WRLT, WKDF, and WNRQ; it has broadcast from that site since 1984. WPLN also repeats its programming on two low-powered repeaters on the fringes of the Middle Tennessee area: WHRS 91.7 FM in Cookeville and WTML 91.5 FM in Tullahoma.

As is the case with other similarly-formatted NPR affiliates, WPLN-FM only broadcasts music programming on Saturday evenings, with a mixture of folk and alternative rock shows.

History

WPLN began as a modest extension of the city's public library system, beginning operations on December 17, 1962 from the Richland Park library branch on Charlotte Avenue in West Nashville. It broadcast a limited schedule, almost entirely of classical music, only on Mondays through Fridays, and was only heard in and around the city of Nashville proper.  A year later, Nashville and Davidson County merged to form a metropolitan government.  The library—and with it WPLN—became an arm of the new structure.

In 1965, the library moved the station into the then-newly constructed main library downtown (it has since been replaced). By that time, the station had begun operating a full seven days a week. The station was one of the 73 charter members of National Public Radio in 1970—one of the first public radio stations in the South to join the network.  The station's website claims it joined NPR in 1968, but this is incorrect; NPR was not founded until two years later.

In 1972, WPLN began broadcasting in stereo and at a full 100,000 watts of power. A "Talking Library" subchannel for blind (and visually impaired) residents of the area began in 1975. Schedule and programming expansion continued at a steady pace throughout the 1980s and 1990s, while WPLN's physical plant did not expand beyond a block of rooms in the library building.

In order to rectify the space shortage and provide more extensive service to the community than was possible under the budgetary and bureaucratic constraints of the public library system, the library board decided in 1995 to begin proceedings to release the station to an independent community board. The public library relinquished control of WPLN-FM on October 1, 1996 to a group known as "Nashville Public Radio." The station eventually moved out of the library into a modern studio in the Metrocenter area on May 24, 1998.

The success of this move may have prompted the Metropolitan Nashville-Davidson County school system, which operated public television outlet WDCN (channel 8), to follow suit three years later.  That station is now WNPT.

WPLN-FM was one of only a few non-commercial FM licenses held by a public library system in the U.S. In most cases, libraries usually operate radio frequencies only for radio-reading services (like that mentioned above) for the blind and visually impaired, signals that are available only on special receivers.

In early 2006, WPLN-FM began broadcasting its programming in digital. More information is found below.

On September 8, 2009, WPLN-FM discontinued its 9 a.m. to 3 p.m. classical music programming in favor of a block of news-and-talk programs from NPR and other providers. That action reflected a trend in medium-sized markets towards orienting public radio schedules in favor of more popular (and perhaps more accessible) political and features programming and away from classical music, whose audiences are aging, according to market researchers.

However, the demand for the spoken-word programs grew to the point that station officials decided to acquire the Vanderbilt University-owned student station WRVU and convert it into a full-time classical music station, WFCL, on 91.1 FM, on June 7, 2011. WPLN thereafter became a full-time news-and-talk station, with feature programming on weekends. This action is similar to earlier ones involving public radio stations and college stations in San Francisco and Houston (the Houston station, however, has since become a religious-formatted FM). Beginning on November 30, 2020, though, WFCL became WNXP (with the call sign actually having changed in early October) and classical programming was replaced by an eclectic music format, largely revolving around the adult album alternative genre. Classical music moved to the HD-2 signal (see below).

Governance
WPLN is governed by a self-perpetuating board of directors, with a separate board of local residents who advise the board of directors on the needs of the listening area.

Digital broadcasting/WPLN-HD2/WPLN-HD3 
In addition to the main FM and AM channels, WPLN now has two digital multicast stations: 90.3 FM HD-2 and 90.3 FM HD-3.

Initially, 90.3 HD-2 featured primarily classical music and music programs, such as The World Cafe and Echoes. In June 2011, following the launch of Classical 91 One, 90.3 HD-2 switched to carrying time-shifted programming from WPLN's main channel. On May 22, 2014, after WPLN discontinued WRVU from its HD3 Channel, and moved XPoNential Radio from its HD2 Channel, to broadcasting full-time on its HD3 Channel, WPLN replaced its time-shifted programming from WPLN's main channel with a simulcast of its AM sister station (WPLN-AM). XPoNential Radio was previously heard on WPLN HD2 overnights, from 6 PM - 6 AM. As mentioned above, in November 2020, classical music replaced all the previous programming on HD-2, music that was heard since 2011 on the former WFCL.

90.3 HD-3 initially carried much of the same programming as WPLN-AM. In June 2011, the HD-3 subchannel was temporarily silenced. On September 1, 2011 at noon, 90.3 HD-3 returned to the air, returning the college alternative format of Vanderbilt University's WRVU to the Nashville airwaves. This lasted until May 22, 2014, when WPLN discontinued WRVU from its HD3 Signal (due to low ratings) and replaced it with XPoNential Radio. WRVU's programming is now solely available online, with no terrestrial broadcasting. Beginning in 2020, the simulcast of WPLN-AM moved to the HD-3 Subchannel of WPLN-FM, replacing XPoNential Radio.

These multicast stations can be heard using a special HD Radio receiver. 90.3 HD-2 and 90.3 HD-3 can also be streamed on the internet through WPLN's website.

Sister stations
In 2002, Nashville Public Radio purchased an existing Medium Wave station to broadcast NPR and local news, talk, and public affairs programs for which the FM did not originally have time on its schedule. The new WPLN-HD2 and HD3 have given Middle Tennessee residents even more choices of music and spoken-word shows. For more information, see WYGI.

References

External links

WPLN-HD2 digital signal

PLN-FM
PLN-FM
NPR member stations